Imbricaria annulata, common name the ringed mitre, is a species of sea snail, a marine gastropod mollusk in the family Mitridae, the miters or miter snails.

Description
The length of the shell varies between 8 mm and 35 mm.

Distribution
This marine species occurs in the Red Sea  down to Mozambique; off China  and Japan;  of the Marquesas

References

 Cernohorsky W. O. (1991). The Mitridae of the world (Part 2). Monographs of Marine Mollusca 4.

External links
 Gastropods.com: Subcancilla annulata

Mitridae
Gastropods described in 1844